José Marroquín may refer to:

 José Marroquín Leal (1933–1998), Mexican actor,
 José Marroquín (sport shooter) (born 1943), Guatemalan sports shooter
 José Manuel Marroquín (1827–1908), president of Colombia